Beheshtian (also Romanized as Beheshtīān) is a village in Abgarm Rural District, Abgarm District, Avaj County, Qazvin Province, Iran. At the 2006 census, its population was 382, in 99 families.

References 

Populated places in Avaj County